Sean Gunn (born May 22, 1974) is an American actor. He is known for his roles as Kirk Gleason on The WB series Gilmore Girls (2000–2007), and Kraglin Obfonteri in the Marvel Cinematic Universe. In this role, he has been in the films Guardians of the Galaxy (2014), Guardians of the Galaxy Vol. 2 (2017), Avengers: Endgame (2019), Thor: Love and Thunder (2022), the television film The Guardians of the Galaxy Holiday Special (2022) and the upcoming film Guardians of the Galaxy Vol. 3 (2023). He also played Weasel and Calendar Man in the Warner Bros./DCEU film The Suicide Squad (2021). He is the younger brother of director James Gunn and often appears in his brother's films.

Career
In 1995 Gunn played Sammy Capulet in the B movie Tromeo and Juliet. In 2000, he guest starred in the second episode of Gilmore Girls as Mick, a DSL cable installer. As the first season continued, he was brought back in the recurring role of Kirk Gleason, one of Stars Hollow's most eccentric citizens. He was a regular cast member from 2002 to the series' end in 2007. He also had a recurring role on October Road as Rooster.

Although he is best known for his Gilmore Girls role, he also has several television guest appearance credits, including Angel; 3rd Rock from the Sun; Yes, Dear; True Jackson, VP; Andy Richter Controls the Universe; and Bunheads. He can also be seen in commercials as an "agent" for the text message information service KGB.com. In films, he has also had several roles, the most substantial being "Alien Orphan/Doug" in The Specials, for which he also received a co-producer credit.

In 2003, Gunn starred in the featurette The Man Who Invented the Moon, directed by fellow Goodman School of Drama alum and Gilmore Girls cast member John Cabrera. Gunn and Cabrera have been close artistic colleagues since their school days in Chicago in the mid-nineties.

Along with his brothers James and Brian, he is a creator and actor in the spoof-porn series James Gunn's PG Porn. He also had a brief role as a computer maintenance man on the Nickelodeon show True Jackson VP. He starred in a series of television commercials for Knowledge Generation Bureau, and appeared in the 2010 film Super, written and directed by his brother James.

He is also the voice actor behind the character of Swan in the Warner Brothers video game Lollipop Chainsaw, also written by his brother James.

Gunn guest-starred in the season 4 episode "Makeover" of Glee as committee member Phineas Hayes.

In 2014, he provided performance capture for the character of Rocket, and played the role of Kraglin, Yondu Udonta's second-in-command, in Guardians of the Galaxy.

In 2014, he held a supporting role in Bones on Fox in the episode "The Corpse at the Convention". In 2017, he reprised his role as Kraglin in Guardians of the Galaxy Vol. 2, playing a larger part, and again provided performance capture for the character of Rocket.

Personal life
Gunn was born in St. Louis, Missouri, the youngest of six children. He is the brother of filmmaker James Gunn, actor and political writer Matt Gunn, screenwriter Brian Gunn, producer and former Executive Vice President of Artisan Entertainment Patrick, and a sister, Beth, who works as an employment attorney. Their parents are Leota and James F. Gunn, a retired partner and corporate attorney with the law firm Thompson Coburn in St. Louis.

Gunn and his brothers attended the Jesuit St. Louis University High School, where he graduated in 1992. He graduated from The Theatre School at DePaul University in 1996.

Gunn is married to actress and film director Natasha Halevi.

Filmography

Film

Television

Video games

References

Sources
 "Gunns Hit Their Target in Hollywood" by Mary Delach Leonard. St Louis Post-Dispatch. March 23, 2003. p. E1

External links 
 

1974 births
American male film actors
American male television actors
DePaul University alumni
Living people
Male actors from St. Louis
20th-century American male actors
21st-century American male actors
Male motion capture actors